The 2001 Junior League World Series took place from August 13–18 in Taylor, Michigan, United States. Aiea, Hawaii, USA defeated San Francisco, Venezuela in the championship game. In addition to being Hawaii's second straight title. Aiea became the first league to win consecutive Junior League World Series.

Teams

Results

United States Pool

International Pool

Elimination Round

References

Junior League World Series
Junior League World Series